Supriya Lohith aka Supriyaa Ram is aplayback singer who has sung for Kannada films.who got basic training in carnatic music from Vidwan Munivenkatappa. she recorded her first song in 2007. She is one of the most eminent playback singers in Karnataka and tops the charts in the kannada singers list with over 500 films songs to her credit

Discography

References

Living people
Indian women playback singers
21st-century Indian singers
Kannada people
Singers from Bangalore
Kannada playback singers
Year of birth missing (living people)
21st-century Indian women singers
Film musicians from Karnataka
Women musicians from Karnataka